Belinda Balluku (born 9 October 1973) is an Albanian politician serving as Deputy Prime Minister of Albania since 2022 and as Minister of Infrastructure and Energy under Prime Minister Edi Rama since 2019.

Political career
In 2004, Mrs. Balluku joined the staff of the Municipality of Tirana, initially as a Public Relations Advisor and later as Director of the Mayor's Cabinet. During this period, she led the development of communication strategies with the public and the media.

References 

Living people
1973 births
Politicians from Tirana
21st-century Albanian politicians
Government ministers of Albania
Women government ministers of Albania
Energy ministers of Albania
21st-century Albanian women politicians